Super Hits, Volume 2 is a greatest hits album by country music artist George Jones, released on March 9, 1993, on the Epic Records label.

Track listing

References

External links
George Jones' Official Website
Record Label

1993 greatest hits albums
Albums produced by Billy Sherrill
Epic Records compilation albums
George Jones compilation albums